The 1963 Buffalo Bulls football team represented the University at Buffalo in the 1963 NCAA University Division football season.  The team was led by seniors Gerry Philbin and John Stofa. The Bulls offense scored 120 points while the defense allowed 85 points.

Schedule

References

Buffalo
Buffalo Bulls football seasons
Buffalo Bulls football